Danshøj station is an S-train junction between Vestbanen and Ringbanen in Copenhagen, Denmark. Opened on 8 January 2005, it serves mainly as an interchange station between B and F.

The station was in the project phase of Ringbanen originally intended to be known as Harrestrup. Due to public comments, however, the name was definitively changed to Danshøj.

Overview
The station has two levels: F stops at the lower level with platforms to the sides of the track; B and Bx stop at the upper level with a platform between the track. The two levels are connected by stairways and lifts.

Intended as an interchange station between Vestbanen and Ringbanen, only pedestrians and bicycles can access the station, as automobiles, including buses, are denied entrance to the station area.

See also
 List of railway stations in Denmark

References

External links

Railway stations in Valby
S-train (Copenhagen) stations
Railway stations opened in 2005
Railway stations in Denmark opened in the 21st century